"Misled" is a song recorded by Canadian singer Celine Dion for her third English-language studio album, The Colour of My Love (1993). It was released as the second single from the album in March 1994 by Columbia Records. The song was written by Peter Zizzo and Jimmy Bralower and produced by Ric Wake. "Misled" topped the US Billboard Dance Club Songs chart and reached number four in Canada. It also peaked at number 15 on the UK Singles Chart and number 23 on the Billboard Hot 100.

Critical reception
AllMusic editor Jose F. Promis reviewed the single, rating it four out of five stars. He called the album version "definitive and muscular", the "Groove Edit" a "soulful, more hip-hop-leaning take on the song", the "MK Radio Remix" and the "Richie Jones Club Mix" "two smooth and sleek house remixes" and finally "MK's History Mix" "deeper and housier". He concluded the review calling the single a rarity and "...she is soulful, sassy, exuberant, campy, and almost just plain nasty, and it works, resulting in a long-forgotten, and definitive highlight (and oddity) in the singer's illustrious career". Larry Flick from Billboard felt that here, Dion "vamps with her rarely displayed, assertive, white-knuckled edge." Troy J. Augusto from Cashbox declared it as "an upbeat, aggressive power dance number", with a "too catchy chorus and left-of-center edginess". 

While referring to Dion's "forcefully resonant and multiflavored vocals", Chicago Tribune editor Brad Webber wrote, "On The Colour of My Love, you've got to dig deep to find them, though, past the crooked roots of a Janet Jackson impersonation ("Misled" and "Think Twice")". Dave Sholin from the Gavin Report wrote, "Mention the name Celine Dion and a lot of people are inclined to think of her hit ballads. To be sure, this French-Canadian songstress has had some of the biggest of the decade. But she's just as comfortable picking up the tempo, which she does with ease on this bright and tight Ric Wake production". Another editor called it "powerful". Lennox Herald stated that here, Dion "gives it her all and manages to inject a certain dramatic punch". Alan Jones from Music Week viewed it as "an altogether less demanding, and less enticing song [than "The Power of Love"], adding that "it chugs along cheerfully enough, and Dion lets rip once or twice, but the song's saving grace is a contagious chorus". Mark Sutherland from Smash Hits gave it two out of five, writing, "This is slightly better, as Ms Dion goes for the Janet Jackson funky lay-dee aproach."

Commercial performance
In Canada, "Misled" entered the RPM Top Singles chart in March 1994 and peaked at number four two months later. On the RPM Adult Contemporary, it reached number two and stayed in this position for five weeks. On The Records charts, "Misled" peaked at number seven on Retail Singles and number two on Contemporary Hit Radio. In the United States, the song debuted on the Billboard Hot 100 in April 1994 and reached number 23 in June 1994. It became Dion's first song to top the US Dance Club Songs, where it stayed at number one for two weeks. It also reached number 15 on the US Adult Contemporary. In the United Kingdom, "Misled" originally reached number 40 in April 1994. However, after the re-release, it achieved a new peak of number 15 in November 1995. "Misled" entered the Australian chart in May 1994 and reached number 55 the next month. In June 1994, it also debuted on the charts in New Zealand and Germany, where it peaked at numbers 31 and 83, respectively. In 2008, "Misled" was included on the European edition of Dion's greatest hits compilation, My Love: Ultimate Essential Collection.

Music video
The accompanying music video for "Misled" was directed by Randee St. Nicholas and released in June 1994. It alternates between scenes of Dion performing in a club, posing in front of a mirror and in a bathtub, and quarreling with a lover. The video was included on Dion's DVD video collection All the Way... A Decade of Song & Video (2001) and on the UK enhanced CD single of "A New Day Has Come".

Live performances
"Misled" was performed by Dion during her 1994-95 The Colour of My Love Tour, her 1995-96 D'eux Tour, her 1996-97 Falling Into You Around the World Tour and during the opening night of Dion's Live 2017 tour in Copenhagen. 
Live versions of "Misled" can be found on The Colour of My Love Concert DVD (1995), Live à Paris DVD (1996) and Live in Memphis VHS (1998).

Accolades
"Misled" won the BMI Pop Award for Most Performed Song in the United States.

In 1997, British DJ Dean Lambert picked the song as one of his top 10 tunes, explaining, "I love this record. You'll probably find that somewhere some girl has sung this to a guy thinking that she has been hard done by. But girls, let me tell you, you aren't the only ones. Back to the record, this is an instant floorfiller. The vocals are reality, but that's life. It's a shame it never got a British release sooner than it did because I know everyone bought the import version at least two years before and l'm sure it would have done a lot better if it had been released sooner in Brltain, but I love It."

In an 2018 review, Pip Ellwood-Hughes from Entertainment Focus noted that the song "saw Dion take a rare departure into a dance-led sound". Christopher Smith from Talk About Pop Music described it as "groovy" and "full-of-life" in his 2019 review.

Formats and track listings

 Australian cassette and CD single"Misled" – 3:30
"Real Emotion" – 4:26
"Misled" (The Serious Mix) – 7:28
"Misled" (Hub Dub) – 6:13

 European and North American 7", cassette and CD single"Misled" – 3:30
"Real Emotion" – 4:26

 European CD maxi-single"Misled" (Album Version) – 3:30
"Love Can Move Mountains" (Album Version) – 4:53
"Real Emotion" – 4:26
"Misled" (Remix) – 7:22

 European CD maxi-single (Remixes)"Misled" (Album Version) – 3:30
"Misled" (MK Mix) – 6:41
"Misled" (MK Dub) – 8:56
"Misled" (MK Lead Mix) – 6:41

 Japanese CD single"Misled" – 3:32
"Real Emotion" – 4:27
"Where Does My Heart Beat Now" – 4:32

 US CD maxi-single"Misled" (Album Version) – 3:30
"Misled" (The Groove Edit) – 4:43
"Misled" (MK Radio Remix Edit) – 3:49
"Misled" (Richie Jones Club Mix) – 7:22
"Misled" (The Groove Mix) – 5:52
"Misled" (MK's History Mix) – 6:41

 US 12" maxi-single"Misled" (Richie Jones Club Mix) – 7:22
"Misled" (MK's History Mix) – 6:41
"Misled" (Album Version) – 3:30
"Misled" (MK's Redirect Mix) – 6:57
"Misled" (MK Dub) – 8:56

 US promotional 12" single"Misled" (MK's Redirect Mix) – 6:57
"Misled" (MK Mix) – 6:41
"Misled" (The Groove Mix) – 5:52
"Misled" (Album Version) – 3:30
"Misled" (MK's Radio Remix Edit) – 3:49
"Misled" (Richie Jones Club Mix) – 7:22
"Misled" (MK's History Mix) – 6:41
"Misled" (MK Dub) – 8:56
"Misled" (Richie Jones Dub) – 6:42

 1995 UK cassette single"Misled" – 3:30
"Je sais pas" – 4:34

 1995 UK CD maxi-single"Misled" – 3:30
"Je sais pas" – 4:34
"Where Does My Heart Beat Now" (Live) – 4:59
"The Power of Love" (Live) – 4:36

 1995 UK CD maxi-single (Remixes)'
"Misled" (Album Version) – 3:30
"Misled" (E-smooves Mission 7") – 4:07
"Misled" (E-smooves Mission 12") – 8:36
"Misled" (E-smooves Mission Dub) – 9:10
"Misled" (MK Club Radio Mix) – 4:08
"Misled" (MK Club Mix) – 6:41

Charts

Weekly charts

Year-end charts

All-time charts

Release history

See also
List of number-one dance singles of 1994 (U.S.)

References

External links

1993 songs
1994 singles
Celine Dion songs
Columbia Records singles
Dance-pop songs
Music videos directed by Randee St. Nicholas
Song recordings produced by Ric Wake
Songs written by Peter Zizzo